Minit Records was an American independent record label, originally based in New Orleans and founded by Joe Banashak in 1959. Ernie K. Doe, Aaron Neville, Irma Thomas, and Benny Spellman were early artists on the label. Later artists included Bobby Womack and Ike & Tina Turner.

History
Allen Toussaint was responsible for much of the label's early success, he wrote, produced, arranged and played piano on a number of tracks. The label's first hit was Toussaint's production of "Ooh Poo Pah Doo - Part 2" by Jessie Hill in 1960. After making a distribution deal with Imperial Records, the label released its biggest hit, "Mother-in Law" by Ernie K-Doe reached the top of the Billboard Hot 100 and the R&B singles chart in 1961.

When Allen Toussaint was drafted into the Army in 1963, the hits dried up and the label was sold to Imperial. Banashak also owned Instant Records, which he kept. Minit was acquired by Liberty Records in 1963 as part of its acquisition of Imperial Records. In 1968, Liberty was bought by Transamerica Corporation and combined with United Artists Records. Two years later Imperial and Minit were shut down and transferred to Liberty. In 1971, Liberty and its remaining labels (except for Soul City, whose catalog was sold to Bell Records) were absorbed into United Artists. In 1979, EMI purchased United Artists. The Minit catalog is currently owned by UMG, successor-in-interest to previous owner EMI.

Label variations
1961-1963: (catalog #s MR-601-626) Orange with black print and disclaimer indicating "C/O Imperial Records, Hollywood, Calif. Later pressings of some records in this period are on the second label."
1961-1963 (catalog #s 626-666): Black label with multi-color logo centered at top reading "MINIT RECORDS" with clock inside lettering; in middle of label, magenta bars contain publishing information and track time (left), catalog number and performance type (right). Silver print for all other text, including disclaimer at bottom which reads "PRODUCED AND MANUFACTURED BY IMPERIAL RECORDS INC. HOLLYWOOD 28, CALIFORNIA, U.S.A."
1964-1968: (new series, catalog #s 32000-32076) Black label with silver print, multi-color logo on left side with "MINIT" inside the logo and "A PRODUCT OF LIBERTY RECORDS" under MINIT.  Disclaimer at bottom of label reads "A DIVISION OF LIBERTY RECORDS."
1969-1970: (catalog #s 32077-32088) Same as black label mentioned above but with the "PRODUCT" disclaimer removed under "MINIT" inside the logo.  Disclaimer at bottom of label now reads "LIBERTY/UA, INC."

Selected discography

Albums

Singles

See also
 List of record labels

References

Defunct record labels of the United States
Record labels based in Louisiana
Record labels established in 1959
Record labels disestablished in 1970